Llanddeusant (the church of two saints) is a small linear village, on Anglesey, North Wales about  north east of Holyhead. The village takes its name from its parish church which is dedicated to St. Marcellus and Saint Marcellina.

Llanddeusant is claimed to be the burial place of Branwen. It has Anglesey's only working windmill, Llynnon Mill, opened in 1775 at a cost of £550 and renovated by the local council in 1986 and opened to the public. The mill was originally located there as it lies just to the north of the Afon Alaw, and a little west of Llyn Alaw.
It also has the areas last working water mill, Melin Hywel.

The co-educational village primary school, Ysgol Gynradd Llanddeusant closed in July 2011 after serving the village for 160 years. On 2 October 2013, the Isle of Anglesey Council planning committee granted permission for the council to demolish the school and build 8 houses.

Notable people 
Robert ap Huw (ca.1580 – 1665), a Welsh harpist, music copyist and gentleman farmer; grew up here

Notes

External links
Illustrated details

Villages in Anglesey
Tref Alaw